This article presents official statistics gathered during the COVID-19 pandemic in Brazil.

Statistics 

 Total confirmed cases 

 New cases, per month 

 Total confirmed cases, by region 

 Growth of confirmed cases 
 Total confirmed deaths 

 New deaths, per month 

 Total confirmed deaths, by region 

 Growth of confirmed deaths 
 Number of cases and deaths, on a logarithmic scale

Case fatality rate 
The trend of case fatality rate for COVID-19 from 26 February, the day first case in the country was recorded.

Timeline table, by state

References

External links 

 https://covid.saude.gov.br/ – Ministry of Health Statistics Panel, updated daily
 https://brasil.io/dataset/covid19/caso_full/ - Brasil.io, an aggregator of the data published by the Brazilian Ministry of Health

statistics
Brazil